"It's a Loving Thing" is a song by Dutch electronic music vocalist CB Milton, released in 1994 as the third single from his debut album by the same name (1994). It was a sizeable hit in Europe, reaching number three in Belgium, and the top 20 in both the Netherlands and Finland, peaking at number 16 and 19. In the UK, the song peaked at number 49, but in March 1995, a remixed version reached number 34. On the UK Dance Singles Chart, it fared better, reaching number 27, while on the European Dance Radio Chart, it peaked at number one. Outside Europe, the song hit success in Israel, peaking at number three. There were made two different music videos to promote the single.

Critical reception
In his weekly UK chart commentary, James Masterton wrote, "For a change, some of the best pop records are down in the lower reaches this week. The debut hit for CB Milton follows a tried and tested Eurodisco formula and in the footsteps of artists such as Haddaway. The result is an extremely radio-friendly hit single which deserves better things than this chart position." Pan-European magazine Music & Media commented that Milton "has drunk out of Haddaway's cup, and now he knows what's love. And what's more, his producers provided him with the right pop techno slammer." They also complimented it as "a restoration of the old values of pop dance." 

A reviewer from Music Week gave the song three out of five, adding, "Milton's soulful voice is down in the mix on this relentless Euro techno stomper, unsurprisingly remixed by the 2 Unlimited production team. Annoying, and annoyingly catchy." In 1995, the magazine named it an "excellent debut single" that "deserved more chart glory than its number 32 peak." James Hamilton from the RM Dance Update declared it as a "huskily lisping black Dutchman's cheesy synth seared galloping 0-137.9bpm Haddaway-ish but more frantic catchy Euro smash".

Track listing

 7", Belgium (1994)
"It's a Loving Thing" (Airplay Edit) – 4:01
"It's a Loving Thing" (Continental Edit) – 3:59

 7" single, UK (1995)
"It's a Loving Thing" (New Mix 7") – 3:50
"It's a Loving Thing" (Greed Club Thang Mix) – 4:41

 CD single, UK (1994)
"It's a Loving Thing" (Airplay Edit) – 4:01
"It's a Loving Thing" (Continental Edit) – 3:59
"It's a Loving Thing" (Continental Clubmix) – 6:14
"It's a Loving Thing" (X-Out in Trance) – 7:04
"It's a Loving Thing" (Extended) – 5:54

 CD maxi, UK (1995)
"It's a Loving Thing" (New Mix 7") – 3:50
"It's a Loving Thing" (Airplay Edit) – 4:01
"It's a Loving Thing" (New 12" Mix) – 5:48
"It's a Loving Thing" (Continental Club-Mix) – 6:14
"It's a Loving Thing" (Greed Lovin' Club Mix) – 7:26
"It's a Loving Thing" (Greed Club Thang Mix) – 4:11
"It's a Loving Thing" (X-Out In Trance) – 7:04

Charts

Weekly charts

Year-end charts

References

1994 singles
1994 songs
1995 singles
Byte Records singles
CB Milton songs
Electronic songs
English-language Dutch songs
Songs written by Peter Bauwens
Songs written by Phil Wilde